Kendall Gender is the stage name of Kenneth Wyse, a Canadian drag performer most known for competing on season 2 of Canada's Drag Race in 2021. She returned to compete in Canada's Drag Race: Canada vs. the World in 2022.

Early life
Wyse was raised in Richmond, British Columbia. He graduated from Cambie high in 2008, before going to Kwantlen Polytechnic University.

Career
Wyse chose the drag name Kendall Gender as a reference to reality television personality Kendall Jenner, although for the Snatch Game episode of Canada's Drag Race, she chose to impersonate Kris Jenner.

Her first time in drag was in 2014, where she performed Beyonce's "Ring the Alarm".

Kendall Gender won the Vancouver's Next Drag Superstar competition in 2017. In 2020, she became the first drag performer to perform the halftime show at the Rugby Sevens tournament. She also recreated four albums by Black artists: Beyoncé's Dangerously in Love, Mariah Carey's Merry Christmas, Rihanna's Unapologetic, and Whitney Houston's Whitney. She was a finalist on season 2 of Canada's Drag Race. She won the show's roast challenge.

Following her run on Canada's Drag Race, she was named to Vancouver Magazine's annual Power 50 list of influential Vancouverites. She has appeared in a campaign for Canadian swim and loungewear brand Londre and is the face of Annabelle cosmetics’ Proud Out Loud collection.

Personal life
Wyse is biracial (half Black and half caucasian). He is based in Vancouver, where he has regularly performed as part of the "Brat Pack" drag troupe alongside his Canada's Drag Race castmates Synthia Kiss and Gia Metric.

Filmography

Web series

References

External links
 

Year of birth missing (living people)
Living people
21st-century Canadian LGBT people
Black Canadian LGBT people
Canada's Drag Race contestants
Canadian drag queens
People from Richmond, British Columbia
People from Vancouver